Nagesh Patil-Ashtikar is Shiv Sena politician from Nanded district, Marathwada. He is member of the 13th Maharashtra Legislative Assembly. He represents the Hadgaon Assembly Constituency.

Career
In 2009 he was Chairman of Hadgaon Taluka Agricultural produce market committee. He was appointed as Hadgaon taluka pramukh of Shiv Sena in 2013. His panel Shri Datta Shetkari Vikas Panel swept elections to Hadgaon Vividha Karyakari Seva Sahakari Sanstha in March 2015.

Controversy
He is amongst 11 members of the 13th Assembly, who have an asset value of over ₹ 1 Crore but haven't declared self Income Tax Return.

Positions held
 2014: Elected to Maharashtra Legislative Assembly
 2015: Elected as Director of Nanded District Central Co-operative Bank

References

External links
 Shivsena Home Page

Maharashtra MLAs 2014–2019
Living people
Shiv Sena politicians
People from Nanded district
Marathi politicians
Year of birth missing (living people)